Savage Pampas may refer to:

 Savage Pampas (1945 film), an Argentine film directed by Lucas Demare and Hugo Fregonese
 Savage Pampas (1966 film), an English-language remake directed by Hugo Fregonese